Ajdin Redžić (born 5 December 1989) is a Slovenian football player, who plays as a striker.

Club career

MFK Košice
He made his Fortuna Liga debut for Košice against Dukla Banská Bystrica on 12 July 2014.

References

External links
 
 MFK Košice profile
 Eurofotbal profile

1989 births
Living people
Slovenian footballers
Slovenian expatriate footballers
Association football forwards
NK Jesenice players
NK Triglav Kranj players
A.C. Reggiana 1919 players
A.C. Isola Liri players
FC VSS Košice players
Slovak Super Liga players
Slovenian expatriate sportspeople in Italy
Expatriate footballers in Italy
Slovenian expatriate sportspeople in Slovakia
Expatriate footballers in Slovakia
Sportspeople from Jesenice, Jesenice